The 2022 James Madison Dukes football team represented James Madison University in the 2022 NCAA Division I FBS football season. They were led by fourth-year head coach Curt Cignetti and played their home games at Bridgeforth Stadium, and competed as a member of the East Division of the Sun Belt Conference.

The season marked the Dukes' first year in the Sun Belt and the FBS and also the first of a two-year transition period. They will not become bowl-eligible until the 2024 season. Ordinarily, the first year of an FCS to FBS transition is spent as an FCS team with a mixed schedule of FCS and FBS opponents, while a schedule more closely resembling that of a typical FBS team is played in the second year. However, the Dukes have 10 FBS teams on their 11-game 2022 schedule, including five home games against FBS teams, which allows their opponents to count James Madison as an FBS team in determining their own bowl eligibility. The Dukes intend to file an application with the NCAA requesting a waiver that would count the 2022 season as the second year of the two-year FCS-FBS transition period. If the waiver application is approved, the Dukes would be eligible to participate in post-season play, including bowl games, starting with the 2023 season.

This season, they became ranked for the first time in the FBS at #25 overall.

Previous season

In their 2021 season, the Dukes posted an overall record of 12–2 and 7–1 in the CAA, earning a share of the conference championship with Villanova. The Dukes received an at-large bid to the FCS Playoffs where they beat Southeastern Louisiana and Montana, before losing to North Dakota State in the semifinals.

On November 6, during the season, it was announced that JMU had accepted a invitation to join the Sun Belt Conference, meaning the 2021 season was their final competing as an FCS program.

Preseason

Media poll
The Sun Belt media days were held on July 25 and July 26. The Dukes were predicted to finish in sixth place in the Sun Belt's East Division.

Sun Belt Preseason All-Conference teams

Offense

1st team
Kris Thornton – Wide Receiver, RS-SR

Roster

Schedule

Game summaries

Middle Tennessee

Norfolk State

at Appalachian State

Statistics

Texas State

at Arkansas State

at Georgia Southern

Marshall

Louisville

at Old Dominion

Statistics

Georgia State

No. 23 Coastal Carolina

Rankings

References

James Madison
James Madison Dukes football seasons
James Madison Dukes